A Scheffel bogie is a flexible, high-stability radial bogie designed to reduce lateral force vibrations and accommodate turning on narrow gauge tracks at high speed. It first went into service in a fleet of South African Railway (SAR) ore wagons in 1975. It is named after its inventor, Dr. Herbert Scheffel, who designed the Scheffel bogie to facilitate the development of South Africa's  narrow-gauge railway system.

See also 
 Articles on bogies and trucks

References 

Bogie